Superionic water, also called superionic ice or ice XVIII is a phase of water that exists at extremely high temperatures and pressures. In superionic water, water molecules break apart and the oxygen ions crystallize into an evenly spaced lattice while the hydrogen ions float around freely within the oxygen lattice. The freely mobile hydrogen ions make superionic water almost as conductive as typical metals, making it a superionic conductor. It is one of the 19 known crystalline phases of ice.
Superionic water is distinct from ionic water, which is a hypothetical liquid state characterized by a disordered soup of hydrogen and oxygen ions. 

While theorized for decades, it was not until the 1990s that the first experimental evidence emerged for superionic water. Initial evidence came from optical measurements of laser-heated water in a diamond anvil cell, and from optical measurements of water shocked by extremely powerful lasers. The first definitive evidence for the crystal structure of the oxygen lattice in superionic water came from x-ray measurements on laser-shocked water which were reported in 2019.

If it were present on the surface of the Earth, superionic ice would rapidly decompress.  In May 2019, scientists at the Lawrence Livermore National Laboratory (LLNL) were able to synthesize superionic ice, confirming it to be almost four times as dense as normal ice and black in color.

Superionic water is theorized to be present in the mantles of giant planets such as Uranus and Neptune.

Properties 
, it is theorized that superionic ice can possess two crystalline structures. At pressures in excess of  it is predicted that superionic ice would take on a body-centered cubic structure. The ice appears black in color.

History of theoretical and experimental evidence 
Demontis et al. made the first prediction for superionic water using classical molecular dynamics simulations in 1988.
In 1999, Cavazzoni et al. predicted that such a state would exist for ammonia and water in conditions such as those existing on Uranus and Neptune.  In 2005 Laurence Fried led a team at Lawrence Livermore National Laboratory to recreate the formative conditions of superionic water. Using a technique involving smashing water molecules between diamonds and super heating it with lasers they observed frequency shifts which indicated that a phase transition had taken place.  The team also created computer models which indicated that they had indeed created superionic water.  In 2013 Hugh F. Wilson, Michael L. Wong, and Burkhard Militzer at the University of California, Berkeley published a paper predicting the face-centered cubic lattice structure that would emerge at higher pressures.

Additional experimental evidence was found by Marius Millot and colleagues in 2018 by inducing high pressure on water between diamonds and then shocking the water using a laser pulse.

2018–2019 experiments 
The water was squeezed into type VII ice, which is 60 percent denser than normal water.

The compressed ice was then transported to the University of Rochester where it was blasted by a pulse of laser light. The reaction created conditions like those inside of ice giants such as Uranus and Neptune by heating up the ice thousands of degrees under a pressure a million times greater than the earth's atmosphere in only 10 to 20 billionths of a second. The experiment concluded that the current in the conductive water was indeed carried by ions rather than electrons and thus pointed to the water being superionic. More recent experiments from the same Lawrence Livermore National Laboratory team used x-ray crystallography on laser-shocked water droplets to determine that the oxygen ions enter a face-centered-cubic phase, which was dubbed ice XVIII and reported in the journal Nature in May 2019.

Existence in ice giants 
It is theorized that the ice giant planets Uranus and Neptune hold a layer of superionic water. Machine learning and free-energy methods predict close-packed superionic phases to be stable over a wide temperature and pressure range, and a body-centred cubic superionic phase to be kinetically favoured, but stable over a small window of paramaters.

On the other hand, there are also studies that suggest that other elements present inside the interiors of these planets, particularly carbon, may prevent the formation of superionic water.

Applications 
Water is widely known for its existence in three different phases i.e solid, liquid and gas just like any other substance or component that exists. However, Wang. et al have discovered a high-pressure ionic phase of water ice. This ice is known to change its structural configuration according to high and low temperatures. Some of the biggest problems industries are addressed using the existence of these three standard states of water but often operations are carried out at very high and low pressures and temperatures and knowledge of this physical/structural property of water ice might help us understand the material and energy exchange in a more detailed and accurate way. It could be understood whether how this change in configuration affects the outcome of the operation and by how much. It is highly likely that this may provide a deeper understanding of the supercritical water that is used in the industries. A well-developed understanding of this phenomenon might help us design processes/operations in a more efficient way by avoiding many losses.

References 

Astrophysics
Forms of water
Water ice